Sankarpur  is a Village Development Committee in Darchula District in the Mahakali Zone of western Nepal. At the time of the 1991 Nepal census it had a population of 2645 people residing in 460 individual households.

References

External links
 UN map of the municipalities of Darchula District

Populated places in Darchula District